New York Fury was a semi-professional American women’s soccer club playing in the Women's Premier Soccer League Elite, the top tier of women’s soccer in the United States in 2012. It was part of the Fury Soccer Organization which also supports the Long Island Fury. The club, founded in 2011, was a member of Women's Premier Soccer League and in 2012 joined the newly formed Women's Premier Soccer League Elite.

History
Following the suspension of Women's Professional Soccer (WPS) in late 2011, it was announced that former Philadelphia Independence coach Paul Riley would lead the New York Fury comprising players he  called the "WPS Supergroup." In March 2012, the team joined the WPSL Elite competing against three teams who previously played in the WPS: Boston Breakers, Chicago Red Stars, and Western New York Flash.

In August 2012, a new top-tier professional league, the National Women's Soccer League (NWSL) was announced. Many of the Fury players went on to play on teams within the league during its inaugural season. Riley was named head coach of the Portland Thorns in 2014 and recruited many of his former players.

Players

2012 roster

Coaches
 Head Coach: Paul Riley
 Assistant Coach: Skip Thorp

References

 
Association football clubs established in 2011
Women's soccer clubs in New York (state)
Women's Premier Soccer League teams
2011 establishments in New York (state)
Women's Premier Soccer League Elite teams